Ottorino Quaglierini (18 May 1915 – 26 July 1992), born in Livorno,  was an Italian rower who competed in the 1936 Summer Olympics.

On 15 August 1936 he won the silver medal as crew member of the Italian boat (Guglielmo Del Bimbo, Dino Barsotti, Oreste Grossi, Enzo Bartolini, Mario Checcacci, Dante Secchi, Enrico Garzelli; helmsman Cesare Milani) in the eight event. With the same crew he won the gold medal in 1937 at the European championships in Amsterdam, and the bronze medal in Milan the following year.

Ottorino Quaglierini was member of Unione Canottieri Livornesi, nicknamed scarronzoni derived from their ungraceful manner of rowing.

See also
 Italy at the 1936 Summer Olympics
 Rowing at the 1936 Summer Olympics

References

External links
 Ottorino Quaglierini profile

1915 births
1992 deaths
Italian male rowers
Olympic rowers of Italy
Rowers at the 1936 Summer Olympics
Olympic silver medalists for Italy
Sportspeople from Livorno
Olympic medalists in rowing
Medalists at the 1936 Summer Olympics
European Rowing Championships medalists